The 2015 UNCAF U-16 Tournament was the 6th UNCAF U-16 Tournament, a biennial international football tournament contested by men's under-16 national teams.  Organized by UNCAF, the tournament took place in Nicaragua between 17 and 23 November 2015.

The matches were played at Nicaragua National Football Stadium.  All seven Central American teams took part of the tournament, playing each other in a round-robin format.  Costa Rica won the tournament.

Venue

Final standings

Results

Goalscorers
7 goals:

  Mario Mora

4 goals:

  Eduardo Guerrero

3 goals:

  José Alfaro
  Diego Valantas
  Luis Palma

2 goals:

  Nicolás Azofeifa
  Ramón Bonilla
  Carlos Mejía
  Andrés Gómez
  Alberto Fruto
  Josué Abarca
  José Canaca
  Patrick Palacios
  Fernando Villalta
  Raúl Morán
  Jorge Clemente

1 goal:

  Carlos Soto
  Carlos Headley
  Óscar Molina
  Erick Bautista
  Trejos (1 owngoal)
  Ángel Pérez
  Fernando Gómez
  Lynner García
  Andrés Hernández
  Carlos Headley
  Engel Balladares
  Vallecillo
  Óscar Castellanos
  Wilder Wilson
  Rainel Rivas
  Christian Muñoz
  Luis Sosa
  Nery Cifuentes
  Tahj Reid

References

External links
 UNCAF Official Website

2015
2015 in youth association football
2015–16 in Nicaraguan football
2015